Maureen Baker may refer to:
 Maureen Baker (doctor)
 Maureen Baker (fashion designer)
 Maureen Baker (sociologist)